Philadelphia is a village in Tyne and Wear, England.  It lies on the A182 road between Newbottle and Shiney Row.

History 
Unlike nearby Washington, it post-dates its namesake in the United States, being named during the American Revolutionary War by a local colliery owner to commemorate the British capture of the city. The village cricket field is named "Bunker Hill", after another famous battle in that war.

Philadelphia was the place of the 1815 Philadelphia train accident, the explosion of the boiler of an early steam locomotive. The number of deaths (16, other sources state 13) was the highest in a railway accident until 1842.

Villages in Tyne and Wear
City of Sunderland